Lisa Schlenker (born October 7, 1964) is an American rower. She competed at the 2004 Summer Olympics in Athens, in the women's lightweight double sculls. Schlenker was born in Lake Oswego, Oregon.

References

1964 births
Living people
American female rowers
Olympic rowers of the United States
Rowers at the 2004 Summer Olympics
Sportspeople from Lake Oswego, Oregon
World Rowing Championships medalists for the United States
21st-century American women